Farmington is an unincorporated community in Union Township, Rush County, in the U.S. state of Indiana.

History
Farmington was originally called Marcellus, and under the latter name was laid out in 1836. A post office was established under the name Farmington in 1846, and it remained in operation until it was discontinued in 1858.

Geography

References

Unincorporated communities in Rush County, Indiana
Unincorporated communities in Indiana